The 2012 Uzbekistan Cup Final was the final match of the 2012 Uzbekistan Cup, the 20th season of the Uzbek Cup, a football competition for the 37 teams in the Uzbek League and Uzbekistan First League. The match was contested by Bunyodkor and Nasaf Qarshi, at Pakhtakor Markaziy Stadium in Tashkent, on 30 November 2012.

Road to the final

Match

References

External links
Uzbek League
PFL.uz: Standings and Results

Cup
2012